Marcelo Ariel Quassi (born 9 November 1982) is a retired Argentine Paralympic swimmer who competed in international level events. He has competed at the Paralympic Games four times and is a four-time Parapan American Games medalist.

References

1982 births
Living people
Sportspeople from Avellaneda
Paralympic swimmers of Argentina
Swimmers at the 2000 Summer Paralympics
Swimmers at the 2004 Summer Paralympics
Swimmers at the 2008 Summer Paralympics
Swimmers at the 2012 Summer Paralympics
Medalists at the 2003 Parapan American Games
Medalists at the 2011 Parapan American Games
Medalists at the 2019 Parapan American Games
Medalists at the World Para Swimming Championships
Argentine male medley swimmers
Argentine male butterfly swimmers
Argentine male breaststroke swimmers
S5-classified Paralympic swimmers